Perfect Gentlemen is a 1978 American made-for-television comedy crime film starring Lauren Bacall (in her television film debut), Ruth Gordon, Sandy Dennis and Lisa Pelikan. The film, produced and directed by Jackie Cooper from a screenplay written by Nora Ephron, was filmed on location in Claremont, California and Hollywood, California from October 27, 1977, to November 1977. It originally premiered on March 14, 1978, on CBS.

Plot
Three women with totally different backgrounds who share a common bond: each needs a large sum of money and each has a husband serving time at a maximum security prison. Lizzie Martin (Lauren Bacall) has been instructed by her husband Ed (Robert Alda) to deliver a $1 million bribe in order to get him an instant parole; however, when she learns he has been having an affair with his secretary, Lizzie wants to disappear but fears for her life if she doesn't carry out his instructions.

Sophie Rosenman (Sandy Dennis) needs money to save the family's bankrupt delicatessen; Annie Cavagnaro (Lisa Pelikan) needs money because she's pregnant, and Lizzie could use the funds to escape from Ed, so the three women devise an elaborate scheme to deliver the bribe money and then steal it back. Mrs. Cavagnaro (Ruth Gordon), Annie's mother-in-law, joins the trio when they discover they need her because of her safe-cracking expertise.

Cast
 Lauren Bacall as Lizzie Martin
 Ruth Gordon as Mrs. Cavagnaro
 Sandy Dennis as Sophie Rosenman
 Lisa Pelikan as Annie Cavagnaro
 Robert Alda as Ed Martin
 Stephen Pearlman as Murray Rosenman
 Steve Allie Collura as Vinnie Cavagnaro
 Dick O'Neill as Mr. Appleton

References

External links
 
 
 
 Perfect Gentlemen at New York Times

1978 television films
1978 films
1970s crime comedy-drama films
1970s heist films
American crime comedy-drama films
American heist films
CBS network films
Films with screenplays by Nora Ephron
Films set in Los Angeles
Films shot in Los Angeles
Films directed by Jackie Cooper
American comedy-drama television films
1970s English-language films
1970s American films